Lovibond may refer to:

 Joseph Williams Lovibond (1833–1918), British brewer
 Degrees Lovibond, a colour scale, named after him
 Lovibond comparator, a type of colorimeter
 Tintometer, a UK company
 Lady Lovibond, a ship
 Ophelia Lovibond (born 1986), English actress
 Lovibond angle